This is a list of professional wrestling promoters in the United States.

Pioneer-era (1900s–1940s)
This section lists notable professional wrestling promoters, especially those of the "Farmer" Burns-Frank Gotch and "Gold Dust Trio"-eras, active prior to the formation of the National Wrestling Alliance (NWA) in 1948.

Dark Red indicates founding members of the National Wrestling Alliance.
Light Red indicates later members of the National Wrestling Alliance.

Territory-era (1940s–1980s)
This section lists notable professional wrestling promoters during the "Golden Age of Professional Wrestling" following the creation of the National Wrestling Alliance (NWA) in 1948. While most promoters operated specific wrestling "territories" as members of the NWA, a number of so-called "outlaw" promotions were also prominent during this period.

Dark Red indicates founding members of the National Wrestling Alliance.
Light Red indicates members of the National Wrestling Alliance.
Green indicates territory-era promoters who are still active.

Modern-era (1990s–present)
This section lists notable professional wrestling promoters from the collapse of the National Wrestling Alliance territory system in the early 1990s up to the 21st century.

See also
List of professional wrestling rosters
Professional wrestling authority figures

Footnotes
 – Entries without a birth name indicates that the individual did not perform under a ring name.
 – This includes the individual's entire time in the wrestling industry as opposed to activities as a promoter.
 – Prior to the formation of the National Wrestling Alliance (NWA) in 1948, many promoters did not publicly operate under a formal company. Instead, wrestling was independently promoted out of major cities and were only loosely affiliated under the National Wrestling Association.
 – This section lists the promotions in which the individual was the owner rather than being employed in a subordinate role such as booker or road agent.

References
General
Hornbaker, Tim. National Wrestling Alliance: The Untold Story of the Monopoly that Strangled Pro Wrestling. Toronto: ECW Press, 2007. 
Specific

Further reading
Drasin, Ric and Bruce Dwight Collins. So, You Want to be a Wrestling Promoter?. Imprint Books, 2003.

External links

Promoters
 
Sports owners